Simon Sadler (born 18 October 1969) is a British businessman, hedge fund owner and the current owner of Blackpool Football Club. He acquired the club out of receivership in 2019, purchasing a 96.2% share in the club, ending the Oyston family's 32-year ownership in the process.

In his second full season as Blackpool's owner, the club won promotion to the second tier of English football after an absence of six years.

Career
Sadler has worked in investment banking in London, Moscow and Hong Kong for large multinationals, including HSBC, until eventually founding his own capital firm, Segantii Capital, in 2007. (Segantii is the name of pre-Roman tribe from the Blackpool area.) As of 2022, Segantii had a portfolio worth £3.5 billion.

He has been described as a "tough but fair character" in the business world.

Blackpool F.C. 
In 2014, Sadler bought Stanley Matthews' FA Cup winners' medal from 1953 for £220,000. Five years later, he purchased Blackpool F.C. for around £10 million.

Blackpool won promotion to the EFL Championship, England's second tier of professional football, in Sadler's first full season of ownership. After the promotion, Sadler explained that he alone cannot fund the investment needed by the club, that it is supported by season-ticket purchases.

Personal life
Sadler grew up on Bispham Road in Bispham, Blackpool. He once had a summer job renting out deckchairs.

He attended Moor Park Primary School, Warbreck School and Blackpool and the Fylde College. He completed a Business Science undergraduate degree at UMIST.

He owns a pug, which he named Kenny, after Kenny Dougall, who scored both of Blackpool's goals in their 2021 EFL League One play-off Final victory over Lincoln City.

Sadler is married to Gillian and has two children. During the COVID-19 pandemic, the Sadlers relocated from Hong Kong to London, partly because he has become less involved with Segantii's main base in Hong Kong and partly to focus on running the football club.

References

1969 births
Living people
People from Bispham, Blackpool
British football chairmen and investors
Blackpool F.C. non-playing staff
Alumni of the University of Manchester Institute of Science and Technology